Robert Herman McCowan (28 February 1875 – 29 April 1941) was a pioneer Australian rugby union player, a state and national representative fullback who played in his country's first Test series of 1899, captaining the national side on one occasion.

Personal life
McCowan was born in Renfrewshire, Scotland. He captained the rugby side at Brisbane Grammar School and after school played at the Past Grammars club.

He ran a successful law practice after his football career but in 1929 he got into some betting trouble with an unsuccessful plunge on Phar Lap in the 1929 Melbourne Cup. He was sentenced to fourteen years for misappropriating over 153,000 pounds from trust funds of clients over a 10-year period 1920-1929). He later worked as a bar-room cleaner.

He is buried in northern New South Wales at Byangum Road Cemetery in Murwillumbah in an unmarked grave.

Representative career
Howell quotes sportswriter Jack Davis who described McCowan as "short, remarkably quick and good in any era....fast, clever in handling, kicking and passing the ball and tackles well...he possessed in high degree the essentials of a crack three-quarter".

McCowan was first selected in a Queensland representative side in 1893 and made 24 appearances for his state up till 1900. He captained the Queensland side in their tour match against Matthew Mullineux's first British Lions to tour Australia in 1899 to a surprise 11–3 victory. He captained Queensland on six other occasions and made appearances against touring New Zealand sides in 1893, 1896 and 1897. New Zealand dual-international George Smith came up against McCowan on the latter of these tours and was reported in The Cynic to have said "If it had not been for McCowan's fine play we would have put up much bigger scores than we did. He is the best fullback we have seen over here - kicks with either foot and is a very sure tackler - I know it".

His national representative debut came in the first Test match of that Lions 1899 tour when he was selected at fullback - this was Australian rugby union's inaugural Test match at the Sydney Cricket Ground on 24 June 1899 and the host team prevailed 13–3. Due to funding constraints he was one of only six New South Wales players (Charlie Ellis, Hyram Marks, Lonnie Spragg, Peter Ward & Robert Challoner) selected to make the trip to Brisbane four weeks later for the second Test. His performance in that match was noted as excellent by the press. With the incumbent skipper Frank Row left out of the team, McCowan was selected by his teammates to lead the side in the second Test match at the Brisbane Exhibition Ground. He again played at fullback in that game and then for the third Test in Sydney in August 1899 he was selected on the wing. He made no further national appearances in his career.

Zavos describes McCowan as the "finest fullback produced by Queensland" to that point and quotes contemporary commentators "stocky and dynamic, fast, very clever in handling, kicking and passing the ball and tackles well"

Bibliography
 Collection (1995) Gordon Bray presents The Spirit of Rugby, Harper Collins Publishers Sydney
 Howell, Max (2005) Born to Lead - Wallaby Test Captains, Celebrity Books, Auckland NZ
 Zavos, Spiro (2000) The Golden Wallabies, Penguin, Victoria

References

1875 births
1941 deaths
Australian rugby union players
Australia international rugby union players
Rugby union players from Renfrewshire
Scottish rugby union players
Scottish emigrants to Australia
Rugby union fullbacks